Worli (ISO: Varaḷī, [ʋəɾ(ə)ɭiː])  is a locality in Central Mumbai, Maharashtra, India. It is one of the four peninsulas of Mumbai with the others being Colaba, Bandra and Malabar Hill. The sea connects it with Bandra 
via the Bandra-Worli Sea Link. Historic spellings include Warli, Worlee, Varli, and Varel. Originally Worli was a separate island, one of the Seven Islands of Bombay which were ceded by the Portuguese to England in 1661; it was linked up with the other islands in the 19th century.

In the 1990s, a group of terrorists attacked a building in Worli as well as major buildings in the city.

Economy 
Go First airlines has its head office in Worli.

Education 

Greenlawns School Worli

Celebrities who Reside in Worli 
Famous Indian celebrities as well as celebrity couples reside in the Worli area of Mumbai:

 Shahid Kapoor 
 Rohit Sharma
 Yuvraj Singh
 Virat Kohli and Anushka Sharma
 Riteish Dekhmukh and Genelia D'Souza

See also

 List of tallest buildings in Mumbai
 Palais Royale, Mumbai
Omkar 1973
 Three Sixty West

References

Neighbourhoods in Mumbai
Islands of India
Populated places in India